This article describes all the 2016 seasons of Formula Renault series across the world.

Formula Renault 2.0L

2016 Eurocup Formula Renault 2.0 season

2016 Formula Renault 2.0 Northern European Cup season

2016 Asian Formula Renault Series season

Formula Renault 1.6L

2016 French F4 Championship season

Unofficial Formula Renault championships

2016 Formula V8 3.5 Series

2016 Formula STCC Nordic season

2016 Formula STCC NEZ season

2016 V de V Challenge Monoplace

2016 Remus Formel Renault 2.0 Pokal season

The season was held between 13 May and 11 September and raced across Austria, Italy, Czech Republic and Germany. The races occur with other categories cars as part of the 2016 Austria Formula 3 Cup, this section presents only the Austrian Formula Renault 2.0L classification.

2016 in formula racing